Collimosina is a subgenus of flies belonging to the family Lesser Dung flies.

Species
P. quadricercus Marshall in Marshall & Smith, 1992
P. spinosa (Collin, 1930)

References

Sphaeroceridae
Diptera of Europe
Diptera of North America
Insect subgenera